Francisco Javier Rodríguez Rubio (born 3 April 1976), also known as Paco Rodríguez Rubio or Pacho Rubio in Indonesia, is a Chilean former professional footballer who played as a striker for clubs in Chile and Indonesia.

Career
As a youth player, he was with both Universidad Católica and Universidad de Chile youth systems, where he coincided with players such as Marcelo Salas and Cristian Leiva in the last,

Despite he joined Arema Malang in the 1997–98 season by suggestion of his older brother and player of the team, Juan, Francisco made appearances in the 1999–2000 season, where he scored 10 goals. In addiiton to his brother, in the club he also coincided with his compatriot Rodrigo Araya.

Previously, he played for PSIM Yogyakarta and PSM Makassar.

Personal life
Francisco and his older brother, Juan, with whom he coincided in Indonesian football, are the sons of the former Chile international footballer Juan Rodríguez Vega and the nephews of the also former footballers Manuel and Gabriel Rodríguez Vega.

As a player of Arema Malang, he was well-known by his temper, being nicknamed Bad Boy.

References

External links
 Francisco Rodríguez Rubio at QtAremania 
 
 

1976 births
Living people
Place of birth missing (living people)
Chilean footballers
Chilean expatriate footballers
Universidad de Chile footballers
PSIM Yogyakarta players
PSM Makassar players
Arema F.C. players
Chilean Primera División players
Indonesian Premier Division players
Chilean expatriate sportspeople in Indonesia
Expatriate footballers in Indonesia
Association football forwards